Marcel Henry (30 October 1926 – 30 August 2021) was a politician from Mayotte, France, who served as French senator (1977–2004). He was one of the founders of the Mahoré People's Movement.

References

1926 births
2021 deaths
Mayotte politicians
French Senators of the Fifth Republic
Mahoré People's Movement politicians
People from Mayotte
Senators of Mayotte